Chen Ke may refer to:

 Chen Ke (basketball) (born 1979), Chinese basketball player
 Chen Ke (artist) (born 1978), Chinese artist
 Chen Ke (table tennis), Chinese table tennis player